Murakatti is a village in Dharwad district of Karnataka, India.

Demographics 
As of the 2011 Census of India there were 218 households in Murakatti and a total population of 1,046 consisting of 541 males and 505 females. There were 159 children ages 0-6.

References

Villages in Dharwad district